Leonard "Iron Legs" Macaluso was an American football player and wrestler.  He played fullback for Colgate University from 1928 to 1930.  Macaluso was the leading scorer among the major college teams in 1930 (145 points) and was one of two players (Ben Ticknor was the other) to be virtually unanimous choices as a first-team All-Eastern player. He was also selected as a first-team All-American in 1930 by the Associated Press, United Press, Colliers, International News Service (INS), New York Evening Post, and New York Sun." Macaluso later became a professional wrestler, competing under the name "Iron Legs" Macaluso.

See also
 List of NCAA major college football yearly scoring leaders

References

All-American college football players
Colgate Raiders football players
American male professional wrestlers
Year of birth missing
Year of death missing